The Sparkassen-Finanzgruppe ("Savings Banks Financial Group") is a network of public banks that together form the largest financial services group in Germany and in all of Europe. Its activity is overwhelmingly located in Germany.

History

The first savings banks in Germany were founded in the 18th century in its major trading cities. One of the first institutions with the business model of modern savings banks was the Ersparungscasse der Hamburgischen Allgemeinen Versorgungsanstalt in Hamburg in 1778. Founders were rich merchants, clerks and academics. They intended to develop solutions for people with low income to save small sums of money and to support business start-ups. In 1801 the first savings bank with a municipal guarantor was founded in Göttingen to fight poverty. In 1838, Prussia adopted the first savings banks legislation, which subsequently served as a model for other German jurisdictions. Between 1850 and 1903 the idea of the municipal savings banks spread and the number of savings banks in Germany increased from 630 to 2834.

During World War I, the Imperial German government leveraged the network of Sparkassen to place war bonds, marking the beginning of their activity in the securities space. In 1934, all savings banks were designated as credit institutions under new banking legislation following the crisis of 1931. The savings banks in East Germany were nationalized and separated from the rest of the network in 1945, but reintegrated into it in 1990.

Key concepts

The Sparkassen-Finanzgruppe is highly idiosyncratic, and its description requires understanding of key notions that are unique to its German context.

Träger

Träger implies a form of control that is not legally a form of ownership but is practically akin to it, given that the Sparkasse is itself an independent public entity but the Träger has ownership-like governance rights over it, with the consequence that most Sparkassen are chaired by local elected politicians. The Träger position cannot be sold, however, and does not entail rights to the Sparkasse's financial surplus which is typically retained or used for local public welfare projects.

Regional principle

The Regional Principle stipulates that entities of the Sparkassen-Finanzgruppe such as Sparkassen or public insurers have a local monopoly within the group within the geographical area in which they are established, namely the territory of their Träger. It is established in the Sparkassen legislation (German acronym SpkG) which is specific to each of the states of Germany except Hamburg, which has no SpkG. The states of Hesse of Schleswig-Holstein have less restrictive legislation on the Regional Principle than the other German Länder, linked to the fact that, as in Hamburg, they have Sparkassen under the legal-form of joint-stock companies (Aktiengesellschaft) as opposed to public-sector entities.

Group entities

In late 2020, the Sparkassen-Finanzgruppe included 520 member entities, as described in its 2021 Annual Report:
 376 local savings banks: 200,676 employees
 6 regional banking groups (including Landesbank Berlin which is directly owned by the DSGV): 33,502 employees
 9 public insurance groups: 26,680 employees
 8 regional building societies (abbreviated as LBS; sometimes translated into English as "building and loan associations") and 7 LBS real estate companies: 7,392 employees
 DekaBank (asset management and wholesale financial services): 4,711 employees
  (IT services): 4,474 employees
 Deutsche Leasing and other leasing companies: 3,441 employees
  (publishing and other group services): 2,100 employees
 Berlin Hyp (property lending): 593 employees
  (car loans and consumer credit): 530 employees
 3 factoring companies: 403 employees
 Sparkassen Rating und Risikosysteme GmbH (risk management): 311 employees
 SIZ GmbH (IT security): 281 employees
 51 capital investment companies: 179 employees

National and regional associations

The Deutscher Sparkassen- und Giroverband (DSGV, self-translated as "German Savings Banks Association") is a nonprofit association, based in Berlin and founded in 1924. It operates as an umbrella organization to facilitate decision-making processes, coordinate strategy, and represent its members' political and regulatory interests at the national and international levels. 

The 12 regional associations are statutory bodies, of which savings banks Träger are statutory members. They are responsible for coordination between savings banks in a region, and manage the regional sub-funds that participate in the Sparkassen-Finanzgruppe's institutional protection scheme (except in Berlin where a special arrangement is in place). They also act as auditors and operate regional savings bank academies for educational and training purposes. 

They are, from north to south: 
  with head office in Kiel, covering Schleswig-Holstein; 
  in Hamburg, covering Bremen and Hamburg; 
  in Berlin, covering Berlin; 
  also in Berlin, covering Brandenburg, Mecklenburg-Vorpommern, Saxony, and Saxony-Anhalt; 
  in Hanover, covering Lower Saxony; 
  in Münster, covering the northeastern part of North Rhine-Westphalia; 
  in Dusseldorf, covering the southwestern part of North Rhine-Westphalia; 
  in Frankfurt and Erfurt, covering Hesse and Thuringia; 
  in Mainz, covering Rhineland-Palatinate; 
  in Saarbrücken, covering Saarland; 
  in Stuttgart, covering Baden-Württemberg; 
  in Munich, covering Bavaria.

The latter are members of both the respective regional Sparkassenverband and the VFS.

Sparkassen

The Sparkassen work as commercial banks in a decentralized structure. Each savings bank is independent, locally managed and concentrates its business activities on customers in the territory in which it is situated under the Regional Principle. In general, Sparkassen are not profit oriented. The Träger of the savings banks are usually single municipalities or several municipalities within a district.  

As banks under public law, the vast majority of Sparkassen have a public mandate which requires that they serve their local stakeholders and local communities. Five institutions known as "free Sparkassen" are or recently were joint-stock companies. Their Träger are charitable foundations. They are members of the VFS, as is  despite its current public-sector legal status. 

Fulfilling public interests is still one of the most significant characteristics of public banks in general and the savings banks in particular. Although public interest is very unspecific, objects of those companies are usually: 
 providing financial and monetary services in economically underdeveloped regions;
 supporting saving processes and accumulation of capital;
 strengthening competition in the banking industry.

The total assets of the Sparkassen amount to about €1 trillion. The 431 savings banks operate a network of over 15,600 branches and offices and employ over 250,000 people. Savings banks are universal banks and provide the whole spectrum of banking services for private and commercial medium-sized customers. 50 million customers maintain business activities with savings banks. Although independent and regionally spread, the savings banks act as one unit under the brand Sparkasse with its iconic logo and recognizable red hue.

The size of savings banks differs widely depending on the economy in their region. While the biggest, Hamburger Sparkasse, had total assets of €37.7 billion and 5,500 employees in 2009, the smallest (Stadtsparkasse Bad Sachsa) had only €129.6 million in assets and 45 employees.

Landesbanken

The Landesbanken are mostly owned by the regional savings banks through its regional association and the respective federal states. In total, the assets of the Landesbanks have shrunk by 45 percent, or more than €702 billion, between end-2008 and end-2017. 

The Landesbanks have traditionally acted as central financial services providers for regional savings bank association and as the "main bank" of the respective . They are also local banks, mortgage banks and general commercial banks. Their duties and powers are codified in the individual banking laws of the Länder (Landesbankengesetze). The specific tasks for the savings banks include central clearing for cashless payments and liquidity funding for the regional savings banks. They also provide many services for the savings banks in the region in securities and cross-country businesses. In contrast to savings banks, they do wholesale banking rather than retail banking. 

After multiple mergers and restructurings, five Landesbanken operated in Germany as of late 2022: 
 Landesbank Baden-Württemberg (LBBW) in Stuttgart
 covers Baden-Württemberg, Rhineland-Palatinate, and Saxony
 owned by the State of Baden-Württemberg (40.53 percent), the regional  (40.53 percent), and the City of Stuttgart (18.93 percent)
 Bayerische Landesbank (BayernLB) in Munich
 covers Bavaria
 owned by the Free State of Bavaria (75 percent minus one share) and the Bavarian  (25 percent plus one share)
 Landesbank Hessen-Thüringen (Helaba) in Frankfurt and Erfurt
 covers Brandenburg, Hesse, North Rhine-Westphalia, and Thuringia
 Norddeutsche Landesbank (NORD/LB) in Hanover
 covers Bremen, Hamburg, Lower Saxony, Mecklenburg-Vorpommern, Saxony-Anhalt, and Schleswig-Holstein
 Landesbank Saar (SaarLB) in Saarbrücken
 covers Saarland
 owned by the State of Saarland (74.90 percent) and the regional  (25.10 percent)

Public insurers

The nine public insurers that belong to the Sparkassen-Finanzgruppe are:
  (est. 1676 as ): North Rhine-Westphalia, most of Rhineland-Palatinate, Schleswig-Holstein, Hamburg, Mecklemburg-Vorpommern
  (est. 1750 as ): most of Lower Saxony, Bremen
  (est. 1992 in Dresden: Saxony
  (est. 1754 as ): parts of southern Lower Saxony
  (est. 1923 in Karlsruhe): west of Baden-Württemberg
  (est. 1764 as ): parts of western Lower Saxony
  (est. 1754 as ): parts of western Lower Saxony

Landesbausparkassen

The core business of the eight  ("Land-level building savings banks") is collective real estate saving products (Bausparen) and low-interest residential mortgage loans, with a share of the German mortgage market of about one-third and cumulative assets of €74.5 billion.. They are, from north to south: 
 Bausparkasse Schleswig-Holstein-Hamburg AG in Hamburg, covering Hamburg and Schleswig-Holstein
 Ostdeutsche Landesbausparkasse AG (LBS Ost) in Potsdam, covering Brandenburg, Mecklenburg-Vorpommern, Saxony, Saxony-Anhalt, and the eastern part of Berlin
 Norddeutsche Landesbausparkasse Berlin – Hannover (LBS Nord) in Hanover, covering Berlin and Lower Saxony
 Westdeutsche Landesbausparkasse (LBS West) in Münster, covering Bremen and North Rhine-Westphalia
 Landesbausparkasse Hessen-Thüringen in Frankfurt, covering Hesse and Thuringia 
 Landesbausparkasse Saar in Saarbrücken, covering Saarland
 Landesbausparkasse Südwest in Stuttgart, covering Baden-Württemberg and Rhineland-Palatinate
 Bayerische Landesbausparkasse (LBS Bayern) in Munich, covering Bavaria

The first Landesbausparkassen were established in 1929. The corporate forms and ownership structures of the Landesbausparkassen are diverse, even though all involve one or several regional associations. Some, like LBS Ost and Bausparkasse Schleswig-Holstein-Hamburg, are joint-stock companies, while others are public-sector entities. Bausparkasse Schleswig-Holstein-Hamburg is owned by the Sparkassenverband (57.5%) and Hamburger Sparkasse (42.5%). LBS Nord is owned by NordLB (44%), Landesbank Berlin (12%) and the Lower Saxon Sparkassenverband (44%). Landesbausparkasse Hessen-Thüringen is majority-owned (68.85%) by the regional Sparkassenverband but also has stakes from the two Länder of Hesse and Thuringia as well as from the two Sparkassenverbände of North Rhine-Westphalia and two legal entities of the Finanzgruppe, FIDES Alpha and FIDES Beta. Landesbausparkasse Saar is owned by the Land (74.9%) and the Sparkassenverband (25.1%) of Saarland. For the others, the relevant regional association(s) are the sole Träger.

DekaBank

DekaBank with its subsidiaries is the central asset manager of the German Savings Bank Finance Group. Based in Frankfurt and Berlin it provides asset management and other services for the Sparkassen and Landesbanks. It resulted in 1999 from the merger of Deutsche Girozentrale (DGZ), established in 1918 as a national hub for the savings banks' regional giro associations, and Deka (Deutsche Kapitalanlagegesellschaft), an investment company established in 1956.

Until 8 June 2011, DekaBank was owned by the DSGV and Landesbanks which grouped the shares in the GLB GmbH & Co.OHG, which held the DekaBank shares. On 7 April 2011, the Savings Banks bought the 50% stake from the landesbanken for €2.3 billion to become sole owner of the DekaBank. The acquisition was closed on 8 June 2011 and DekaBank became fully, directly owned by the savings banks.

3,700 people throughout the group work in one of the three business divisions AMK (Asset Management Capital Markets), AMI (Asset Management Real Estate Business), C&M (Corporates and Markets), the sales division or one of the corporate centers.

Foundations

As of end-2020, the Savings banks network maintained a total of 769 foundations in Germany, with total capital of €2.72 billion.

Group arrangements

The internal legal and financial arrangements of the Sparkassen-Finanzgruppe are complex, in line with its largely decentralized structure that mirrors its long history.

Institutional protection scheme

The core feature of the Sparkassen-Finanzgruppe is a set of mutual support arrangements known as an Institutional Protection Scheme (IPS) in EU law, namely the Capital Requirements Regulation. The Sparkassen-Finanzgruppe IPS is complex and its contractual details are not made public. It started in 1969 with the establishment of protection schemes  on a regional basis, expanded to the Landesbanks through a community of liability ) in 1973, and reformed in 2005 following negotiations with the European Commission on state aid control.

As of 2021, the Sparkassen-Finanzgruppe IPS included 13 participating sub-funds: 
 eleven regional Savings Banks sub-funds managed by the respective regional , covering all of Germany except Berlin which relies on the reserve fund of the Landesbank Berlin; 
 a national sub-fund of the Landesbanken and DekaBank (which includes Landesbank Berlin AG, and included Hamburg Commercial Bank, a restructured former Landesbank, until end-2021); 
 a national sub-fund of the eight .

Each of the regional sub-funds absorbs losses as needed to preventively support a member entity in need, unless it is itself depleted in which case it is in turn supported by the other regional sub-funds on a proportional basis ("supra-regional equalization") and, if further needed, also by the two national sub-funds ("system-wide equalization"). The exact formula for such equalization, however, has not been made clear in the public domain, and the protection is in no way automatic but instead relies on voting within the Sparkassenverbände and other managers of the relevant sub-funds. The corresponding uncertainty has generated concerns from the supervisors at the European Central Bank and BaFin and partial reform of the IPS adopted by the DSGV in August 2021. A new national protection fund is to be set up with 2.6 billion euro to be paid in by the Sparkassen and Landesbanken between 2025 and 2032, which is expected to allow for faster intervention in future cases of need, complementing the existing IPS setup of 13 regional and sectoral sub-funds.

The DSGV does not generally disclose cases or amounts of IPS interventions. One known case was the rescue of Norddeutsche Landesbank in 2019, in which the IPS contributed 1.2 billion euro in fresh equity in addition to contributions by the relevant Länder. This case also highlighted the protracted nature of the Sparkassen-Finanzgruppe's IPS decision-making process, with a delay of nearly five months from the IPS's intervention decision to the agreement on basic principles for NordLB's recapitalization.

Deposit guarantee scheme

In line with the EU Deposit Guarantee Scheme Directive of 2014, the IPS of the Sparkassen-Finanzgruppe is also designated as the deposit guarantee scheme for all its member banks. in August 2021, the DSGV members unanimously adopted a resolution to reform the system and establish a Deposit Insurance Fund, gradually from 2024-2025.

Accounting and auditing

The Sparkassen-Finanzgruppe publishes unaudited, unconsolidated, aggregated financial statements of the German activities of its group entities, in line with the disclosure requirement for IPSs enshrined in Article 113(7)(e) of the EU Capital Requirements Regulation. Specifically, the scope of aggregation in 2021 (report on the financial year 2020) included all Savings Banks, Landesbanken, Landesbausparkassen, as well as Hamburg Commercial Bank since it was still affiliated with the Institution Protection Scheme. Neither the foreign branches of Landesbanken nor any of their subsidiaries, whether domestic or foreign, are included, and neither are the foreign branches of Landesbausparkassen. On that basis, the group had total aggregated assets of €2.4 trillion as of end-2020, of which 1.4 trillion in the local savings banks.

Most entities of the Sparkassen-Finanzgruppe have no external auditors but are audited instead by audit entities of the group itself. Some group-level entities such as DekaBank, however, publish externally audited financial statements.

Branding

The S-shaped logo of the Sparkassen-Finanzgruppe is one of Germany's most recognizable brand images. It was introduced in 1938 and given its present form, with the trademark red color, in 1972 by designer Otl Aicher.

Leadership

 1924–1935: 
 1935–1945: Johannes Heintze
 1945–1967:  (1945–1953 as )
 1967–1972: 
 1972–1993: 
 1993–1998: Horst Köhler
 1998–2006: 
 2006–2012: 
 2012–2017: Georg Fahrenschon
 2017–present:

See also
 Erste Group in Austria 
 Südtiroler Sparkasse – Cassa di Risparmio di Bolzano in Italy 
 Banque et Caisse d'Épargne de l'État in Luxembourg 
 Swedbank in Sweden
 SpareBank 1 in Norway
 Sberbank in Russia 
 Groupe Caisse d'Épargne in France 
 German Cooperative Financial Group, the other large German network of non-joint-stock banks

Notes

Banks of Germany
Public finance of Germany
Government-owned companies of Germany
Government-owned banks